Alexander Martin Korb (born 1976) is a German historian specialising in the Holocaust, Genocide, anti-Semitism and related mass crimes in Central and Eastern Europe. Since 2010 Korb has been Lecturer in Modern European History at the University of Leicester. From 2012 until 2018 he was director of the Stanley Burton Centre for Holocaust Studies.

Biography 
Korb studied history and received an M.A. in contemporary and Medieval History from the Technical University of Berlin in 2004, and in gender studies from the Humboldt University of Berlin. In addition he studied History, Russian and Baltic studies at Charles University Prague, State University Voronezh, Université d'Aix-Marseille, and Ludwigs Maximilian Universität München.

During his research fellowship at the United States Holocaust Memorial Museum in the 2006–2007 academic year, Korb was a PhD candidate in history at Humboldt University. For his doctorate he examined mass violence in the Balkans during World War II. To this end, he spent several months researching the archives of the Yugoslav successor states, Italy, Germany and Israel. He is considered one of the leading European experts on the history of the Second World War in Croatia.

In 2010, Korb was appointed Lecturer in Modern European History at the University of Leicester, he completed his PhD in 2011. He was director of the Stanley Burton Centre for Holocaust and Genocide Studies, a major research center within the university, between 2012 and 2018. Korb held fellowships at Yad Vashem, the Vienna Wiesenthal Institute, the US Holocaust Memorial Museum, the USC Shoah Foundation and the Imre Kertesz Kolleg at the Friedrich Schiller University Jena.

Selected works

Books 
 

Awarded the prize of the Foundation.

 

Awarded, among others, the Fraenkel Prize in Contemporary History of the Wiener Library (London), Irma Rosenberg Prize of the Institute for Contemporary History of the University of Vienna, Andrej Mitrović Prize of the Michael Zikic Foundation (Bonn) and Herbert Steiner Prize of the Documentation Centre of Austrian Resistance and the International Conference of Labor and Social History (Vienna).

 

Awarded The Wiener Holocaust Library's Fraenkel Prize

Articles 

 Homogenizing southeastern Europe, 1912–99: ethnic cleansing in the Balkans revisited (2016)
 Völkisch Journalists in Postwar Germany: Intellectual Continuities in German Journalism, 1930–70 (2015)
 Mastering the Balkans: German, Italian, and Endogenous Population Policies 1941–43 (2010)

Memberships 
Positions and memberships:

 Editorial board of Humanities – Sozial und Kulturgeschichte (H-Soz-u-Kult)
 Association of historians in Germany (VHD)
 German History Society (GHS) I
 International Network of Genocide Scholars (INoGS)
 German Association for Historical Peace and Conflict Research (AKHF)
 Working Group on Military History

References

External links 
 
 
 Alexander Korb at the USC Shoa Foundation

1976 births
Living people
20th-century German historians
University of Leicester
Humboldt University of Berlin alumni
Technical University of Berlin alumni